West Barnstable is a seaside village in the northwest part of the town of Barnstable, Massachusetts. Once devoted to agricultural pursuits, West Barnstable now is largely residential and historic. Originally founded in 1639 as part of its neighboring village Barnstable, MA, West Barnstable separated in 1717 with the split into two parishes of the local congregational church.

Natural features
These include six-mile long Sandy Neck Barrier Beach which protects the extensive Great Marshes, the latter a source of salt hay that attracted the first English settlers to the area in the mid-17th century.

Notable people
Remarkably, in the 18th century, the village produced four nationally prominent leaders at a time when there were no more than 500 inhabitants. James Otis the Patriot was the original intellectual leader of the revolutionary movement in Boston in the years leading up to the War of Independence.

His sister, Mercy Otis Warren, also born next to the Great Marshes, became a political activist, one of the first women writers in the country, and a historian of note.  She is a member of the Women's Hall of Fame.

Lemuel Shaw, another native of the village, held the important post of chief justice of the Massachusetts Supreme Judicial Court from 1830 to 1860 and earned the reputation of a leading jurist in the nation's formative constitutional history.

The fourth native, Captain John "Mad Jack" Percival, rose to the highest rank in the U.S. Navy, serving in four wars.  In late 1844 he saved and restored the U.S. frigate Constitution and then sailed her around the world, the venerable ship's only circumnavigation.

Description
The fully restored 1717 Congregational meetinghouse, West Parish of Barnstable, UCC, (West Parish Memorial Foundation) remains a central feature of the village. Also in the center of town, The Old Village Store is a historic and prominent place for locals. Sandy Neck Beach, the largest beach on the mid-cape, is located in the village. Most of West Barnstable consists of Sandy Neck, the Great Marsh/Barnstable Harbor, and the popular West Barnstable Conservation Area.  In the late 19th and early 20th centuries a number of Finnish immigrants settled here, and, to this day, the eastern side of the village is known as "Finn Town", while the area near the West Barnstable Train Station is known as "Shark City" reputedly because of the card sharks who hung out there.

Education
West Barnstable is home to Cape Cod Community College, the only college on the Cape proper, as well as the Cape Cod Conservatory of Music, Art, Drama & Dance.

Transportation
The town was one that had been served by Amtrak's Cape Codder train service (1986-1996); however, it has been eliminated from the schedule of the seasonal Cape Flyer train service. From the 19th Century, under the Old Colony Railroad and until 1964 under the New York, New Haven and Hartford Railroad, passenger trains served Sandwich. Trains of the 1940s-1960s included the Day Cape Codder and the Neptune.

See also
West Barnstable Train Station

References

External links
 History of the West Barnstable Brickyard 
 Whelden Memorial Library
 West Parish Memorial Foundation
 West Barnstable Old Village Store

Populated coastal places in Massachusetts